The Chenderoh Lake is a natural lake in Kuala Kangsar District, Perak, Malaysia.

References

Lakes of Malaysia
Landforms of Perak
Tourist attractions in Perak